The men's parallel bars competition at the 1948 Summer Olympics was held at Earls Court Exhibition Centre on 12 and 13 August. It was the seventh appearance of the event. There were 122 competitors from 16 nations, with each nation sending a team of up to 8 gymnasts. The event was won by Michael Reusch of Switzerland, with his countrymen Christian Kipfer and Josef Stalder tying for bronze. Between the Swiss gymnasts was Veikko Huhtanen of Finland, taking silver. Reusch was the first man to win multiple medals in the event (and the only one to do so 12 years apart); Stalder would become the second in 1952. It was Switzerland's second victory in the event, tying Germany for most gold medals.

Background

This was the seventh appearance of the event, which is one of the five apparatus events held every time there were apparatus events at the Summer Olympics (no apparatus events were held in 1900, 1908, 1912, or 1920). Four of the top 10 gymnasts from 1936 returned: silver medalist Michael Reusch of Switzerland, seventh-place finisher Heikki Savolainen of Finland, ninth-place finisher Savino Guglielmetti of Italy, and tenth-place finisher Lajos Tóth of Hungary. Reusch was the reigning world champion, though the title was 10 years old—no world championship had yet been held post-World War II, so the 1938 event was the latest.

Argentina, Cuba, Denmark, and Egypt each made their debut in the men's parallel bars. The United States made its sixth appearance, most of any nation, having missed only the inaugural 1896 Games.

Competition format

The gymnastics format continued to use the aggregation format. Each nation entered a team of up to eight gymnasts (Cuba and Argentina had only 7; Mexico only 5). All entrants in the gymnastics competitions performed both a compulsory exercise and a voluntary exercise for each apparatus, with the scores summed to give a final total. The scores in each of the six apparatus competitions were added together to give individual all-around scores; the top six individual scores on each team were summed to give a team all-around score. No separate finals were contested.

For each exercise, four judges gave scores from 0 to 10 in one-tenth point increments. The top and bottom scores were discarded and the remaining two scores summed to give the exercise total. If the two scores were sufficiently far apart, the judges would "confer" and decide on a score. Thus, exercise scores ranged from 0 to 20, apparatus scores from 0 to 40, individual totals from 0 to 240, and team scores from 0 to 1,440.

Schedule

All times are British Summer Time (UTC+1)

Results

References

Men's parallel bars
1948
Men's 1948
Men's events at the 1948 Summer Olympics